The Canadians′ Choice Party (CCP) is a minor political party based in Ontario, Canada. The party is led by Bahman Yazdanfar.

History
The Canadians' Choice Party was founded on August 26, 2011 by Bahman Yazdanfar of Toronto. Yazdanfar, who immigrated to Canada from Iran in 1986, ran a small consulting firm for businesses until 2008, when the global economic recession caused him to close. After the failure of his business, Yazdanfar began a talk show on YouTube which interviewed subjects ranging from mainstream local figures to political extremists.

In 2015, in response to public outcry over Your Ward News, a local newspaper delivered to households in The Beaches that was banned by Canada Post for carrying anti-Semitic and racist content, Yazdanfar supported the publication, buying advertising in it and decrying the Ontario government's laying of criminal charges against the publication's publisher and editor for hate speech.

The party failed to win any seats in the 2022 Ontario general election.

Platform
The party bills itself as a "party of independents" and offers very few barriers for entry. To run as a candidate for the party, a candidate has to:
 Show responsibility first to the riding they represent when they become MPP.
 Show commitment to stay in the Canadians' Choice Party for the entire mandate once elected.
 Not cross the floor.
 
On its website, the party supports four priorities:

 Fiscal responsibility and respect for taxpayers,
 Individual freedom and the right to free speech,
 Sovereignty and protection of common-law rights,
 Transparency and accountability in government.

It also calls for the ability to recall elected officials and calls for more referendums.

Controversy and associations with Neo-Nazism
The party's position on unfettered free speech has caused controversy in the 2018 provincial election when several of its candidates were found to be associated with the neo-Nazi movement in Canada. James Sears, who ran in the riding of Ottawa Centre, is the editor of the far-right newspaper, Your Ward News, and claims to be an adherent of Nazism. Another of the party's notable candidates is Paul Fromm, a prominent Canadian white supremacist, who ran in Etobicoke Centre.

Electoral results
In the 2011 Ontario general election, the Canadians' Choice Party nominated three candidates for the Legislative Assembly of Ontario:

In the 2014 election, Yazdanfar and Richardson ran again, this time joined by Dorian Baxter, perennial candidate for the Progressive Canadian Party.

In the 2018 election, the party ran five candidates:

References 

Provincial political parties in Ontario
2011 establishments in Ontario
Political parties established in 2011
Organizations based in Toronto
Neo-Nazism in Canada